Ballyhenry (Baile an Hanraígh in Irish) is a townland in the Barony of Ikerrin, County Tipperary, Ireland. It is located in the civil parish of Bourney south of Roscrea.

References

Townlands of County Tipperary